Nadesan or Natesan is a South Indian male given name. Due to the South Indian tradition of using patronymic surnames, it may also be a surname for males and females.

Notable people

Given name
 Aiyathurai Nadesan (died 2004), Sri Lankan journalist
 Balasingham Nadesan (died 2009), Sri Lankan rebel
 C. Natesa Mudaliar (1875–1937), Indian politician
 F. G. Natesa Iyer (1880–1963), Indian activist
 G. A. Natesan (1873–1948), Indian writer and politician
 K. Natesa Iyer (1887–1947), Ceylonese journalist, trade unionist and politician
 R. Nadesan, Indian politician
 S. Nadesan (1904–1986), Ceylonese lawyer
 S. Natesan (Subbaiya Nadesapillai) (1895–1965), Ceylonese politician
 S. V. Natesa Mudaliar, Indian politician
 V. Paulraj Natesan, Indian politician

Surname
 Kaliakudi Natesa Sastry, Indian musician
 Natesan Ramani (born 1934), Indian musician

See also
 
 
 

Tamil masculine given names